Charles Edgar Hare (16 July 1915 – 18 November 1996) was a British tennis player active in 1930s, 1940s and 1950s.

Tennis career
1937 was by far Hare's most successful year, reaching the quarterfinals of the French Championships and the U.S. National Championships, the fourth round of Wimbledon and playing for Great Britain in the Challenge Round of the 1937 Davis Cup.

He was ranked World No. 10 by A. Wallis Myers of The Daily Telegraph for 1937.

In January 1943 he married tennis player Mary Hardwick in Phoenix, Arizona. Both worked for Wilson Sporting Goods.

Grand Slam finals

Doubles (2 runner-ups)

References

External links 
 
 
 

1915 births
1996 deaths
Sportspeople from Birmingham, West Midlands
English male tennis players
British male tennis players
Tennis people from the West Midlands (county)